The Shire of Glenelg is a local government area in the Barwon South West region of Victoria, Australia, located in the south-western part of the state. It includes the towns of Casterton, Heywood, Merino and Portland. Although a shire of the same name existed before the amalgamations of the mid-1990s, the current Shire was formed in 1994 from the amalgamation of the former Shire of Glenelg with the Shire of Heywood and City of Portland.

The Shire is governed and administered by the Glenelg Shire Council; its seat of local government and administrative centre is located at the council headquarters in Portland, it also has service centres located in Casterton and Heywood. The Shire is named after the Glenelg River, a major geographical feature that meanders through the Shire.

At the 2001 Census, the population of the Shire was distributed in the following way:
Portland: 49.7%, Casterton: 8.7%, Heywood: 6.3%, Dartmoor: 1.3%, Merino: 1.1%, Narrawong: 0.9% and Rural Balance: 32%.

Service industries, timber production, grazing and manufacturing are the Shire's main economic activities.

Traditional ownership
The formally recognised traditional owners for the area in which Glenelg Shire sits are the Gunditjmara People who are represented by the Gunditj Mirring Traditional Owners Aboriginal Corporation.

Council

Current composition
The council is composed of seven councillors elected to represent an unsubdivided municipality. The current councillors, in order of election at the 2020 election, are:

Administration and governance
The council meets in the council chambers at the council headquarters in the Portland Municipal Offices, which is also the location of the council's administrative activities. It also provides customer services at both its administrative centre in Portland, and its service centres in Casterton and Heywood.

Townships and localities
The 2021 census, the shire had a population of 20,152 up from 19,557 in the 2016 census

^ - Territory divided with another LGA

See also

List of localities (Victoria)

References

External links
Glenelg Shire Council official website
Metlink local public transport map
Link to Land Victoria interactive maps

Local government areas of Victoria (Australia)
Barwon South West (region)